The 1947 Allan Cup was the Canadian senior ice hockey championship for the 1946–47 season.

Final 
Best of 7
Montreal 7 Calgary 3
Calgary 2 Montreal 1
Montreal 7 Calgary 0
Montreal 4 Calgary 3
Calgary 1 Montreal 0
Calgary 5 Montreal 2
Montreal 8 Calgary 2

Montreal Royals beat Calgary Stampeders 4-3 on series.

External links
Allan Cup archives 
Allan Cup website

 
Allan Cup
Allan